Football Unites, Racism Divides (FURD) is a youth and social inclusion project and charity based in Sheffield, England which uses football as a tool to 'break down barriers created by ignorance or prejudice'.  It works locally, nationally and internationally to combat racism and increase understanding between different communities.

Origins
The project was created in November 1995 by a group of Sheffield United fans who were concerned with the number of racially invoked incidents occurring in and around Bramall Lane, especially because of the stadium being located in a particularly ethnically diverse area of the city.  FURD has since evolved into a wider community project. Whilst the organisation uses footballing activities, it is increasingly involved in more general inclusion work such as delivering anti-racist education in schools and providing volunteering opportunities for young people.  It is also a founding member of the FARE (Football Against Racism in Europe) network of anti-racist organisations.

Footballing work
Much of FURD's work focuses on using football as a tool for social change.  This includes using footballing initiatives in the local community, international events and affiliations with professional clubs.

Coaching
FURD hosts subsidised coaching at Sheffield United's Academy, and players who show potential are referred to local professional teams. It was FURD's coaches who recommended Kyle Walker to Sheffield United when he was just seven years old. Walker graduated to the United first team before being sold to Tottenham Hotspur. He has since joined Aston Villa on loan and represented England Men's team. FURD also offers coaching sessions in local schools, often as part of a joint package with an educational element.  FURD also recognises women as a marginalised group in football and has sought to create women's initiatives, especially to appeal to those from ethnic minorities.  Students at The University of Sheffield conducted a survey called ‘Crossing the Line’ which demonstrated the young girls are more likely to be put off from joining in football due to anxieties over sexism rather than racism or cultural factors.  Therefore, FURD has run female-only coaching sessions and girls’ tournaments have been a regular feature at the annual Community Day at Bramall Lane.

Tournaments
Small-sided tournaments are regularly held by FURD in a variety of venues, often coinciding with school holidays. One of the most prestigious tournaments is held at Sheffield United's Community Day during the off-season.  FURD also runs the annual All Nations Tournament in conjunction with Sheffield and Hallamshire County Football Association for teams of refugees and asylum  seekers. FURD also hosted Kick It Out’s 2006 Unity Cup, a national tournament for refugees and asylum seekers.

Streetkick
Streetkick is a portable, inflatable miniature football pitch which can fit into the back of a van. It enjoys a cult status and is one of FURD's more recognisable and high-profile areas of work.  Being highly practical and mobile, it has been toured at the European Championships in 2004 and 2008 as well as the World Cup in 2006. The pitch sides can be adorned with anti-racist banners and it provides a focal point for spreading FURD's message.

Links with professional clubs
FURD works with Sheffield's two professional clubs in a number of fields to deliver anti-racist work.

Sheffield United
FURD works closely with Sheffield United, largely due to its origins stemming from Blades supporters as well as the proximity of the charity to Bramall Lane.  FURD has regular articles in the matchday programme, anti-racist messages displayed on the scoreboard and subsidised use of the Academy facilities.  Bramall Lane's annual Community Day was instigated and largely run by FURD from 1999 to 2008, with the club taking ownership of it in 2009. FURD is a partner in Sheffield United's Kickz project, which shares FURD's philosophy about the power of football to bring positive benefits to young people and communities.

Sheffield Wednesday
Sheffield Wednesday have also been involved with FURD's work, although to a lesser extent. FURD was a member of the Owls Against Racism group, and has run joint educational events through Show Racism the Red Card. The club is a partner in FURD's Soundkickers music project.

Affiliated clubs
FURD supports a number of clubs in Sheffield's Sunday leagues, by providing administrative help, coaches, or advice about funding.

Sharrow United
Sharrow United was the brainchild of Asian teenagers Kamran Khan, Asim Shazad and Idris Ahmed in 2000. FURD agreed to help the boys undertake the formalities required to establish their team and Sharrow United was entered into the Sheffield Regional Alliance Division Two for the 2000/1 season.  They encountered plenty of hostility including racism in their first season, but they persevered to finish as runners-up in the league and gain promotion.  The team won promotion in their first two seasons and won the Regional Alliance League Cup in 2004.  They then entered Sheffield's top Sunday League, the Meadowhall League for the 2004/5 season.  They have enjoyed considerable success since entering the league, the highlights being lifting the Meadowhall Sunday League Cup in 2008 and winning promotion to the Premier Division in 2010.

Somali Blades
The Somali Blades were established when Sheffield United donated kits and they rose to prominence in 1998 when they reached the final of the Mondiali Antirazzisti in Italy. Also in 1998, they won one of the Philip Lawrence Awards, a national award for good citizenship, to recognise their work in coaching younger Somali children.

Others
Other teams that FURD has worked with include the African Dream Team, Surud United, Porter United, Yemeni United, Sharrow Athletic and FURD Positive Futures Under-18s.

Non-footballing work
FURD is also involved in many others aspects of community life in Sheffield as well as further afield which aren’t directly related to football or sport.

Education programmes
FURD runs bespoke educational sessions in schools, prisons, hostels and youth centres looking at issues around race, culture, identity and conflict. Educational work has been deemed especially necessary due to the reported rise of misconceptions of race and ethnicity and a growth in Islamophobia since the September 11th, 2001 attacks on the United States. FURD also offers training and consultation for professionals.

Resources and information
FURD also has an extensive resources and information library at its office in The Stables block next to Mount Pleasant Community Centre in Sharrow, Sheffield.  The material stored covers a range of subjects pertaining to all aspects of FURD's work.  The content of the collection is catalogued and searchable online and can be borrowed upon request. Enquiries about football and equality can also be answered by phone, letter or email, and information is made available online where possible on FURD's website. A number of exhibitions are available for hire. FURD has undertaken in-depth research about the experiences of South African footballers playing in Britain from 1899 to 2009 for an exhibition, ‘Offside! Kick Out Ignorance - Football Unites, Racism Divides’ on display the Homecoming Centre of the District Six Museum in Cape Town from June 2010 to June 2011. Supporting materials are available from FURD.

Volunteering
Building on the success of the now-defunct Millennium Volunteers scheme, FURD now works with the charity v to inspire hundreds of young people aged 16–25 to volunteer in their own community.  Voluntary opportunities that FURD offers include working with young offenders, mentor schemes for refugees, football coaching, art and dance workshops, organising events, advocacy/campaigning and promotion/publicity. The aims include improving the self-esteem, confidence and skills of the participants, as well as improvements in community cohesion. FURD's ‘Youth Against Conflict’ group made a film and education pack, ‘It’s Your Call’, in which young people enacted conflict scenarios they had experienced, including gang violence and racist bullying, and viewers are encouraged to think about and discuss different ways of resolving the issues.

Positive Futures

FURD is partnered with Positive Futures, a national sports-based inclusion programme.  In partnership they run sports and other activities to try to prevent young people from being socially marginalised and being drawn into crime, drugs and anti-social activity.

Soundkickers
Funded by the Youth Music Power Play fund, Soundkickers is an initiative which allows young people to work alongside professional musicians to develop their musical talents. Workshops offer a range of activities including learning DJ skills, writing and recording lyrics, and playing instruments. A ten-track CD is now available showcasing some of talent coming out of the workshops.

Football: a shared sense of belonging?
This is a 3-year research project, funded by the Big Lottery, which is investigating the role football may play in fostering mutual understanding and integration between refugees, asylum-seekers and other new migrants. The project offers opportunities for young people, especially those from refugee backgrounds themselves, to develop research skills, as well as to share their own experiences.

Events
FURD often runs events in Sheffield using different means to spread their message.  FURD also supports its volunteers in pioneering their own ideas for new or one-off events.

Vibes & Unity
Vibes & Unity is a music event held on Devonshire Green in Sheffield in May 2009 and May 2010 which featured DJs, singers, dancers and musicians, football, public speakers, food stalls and other entertainment. It has been organised largely by FURD's young volunteers from the Vinvolved programme. The main focus of the event has been on spreading an anti-racist message and encouraging young people to use their vote in forthcoming elections in order to marginalise the far-right parties.

Community Day at Bramall Lane
Following the success of FURD's two entrants in the Mondiali Antirazzisti in 1998, where Somali Blades and the Abbeydale Asian Youth Project both made the final, the idea was pitched to replay the final at Bramall Lane the next summer.  The concept evolved to create the first annual Community Day in May 1999 and the event has run almost every year since.  Small-sided tournaments take place on the pitch and other events take place around and outside the stadium.  The Community Day regularly involves the Streetkick inflatable pitch, a bouncy castle, live music performances and stalls from local community groups. The Day aims to encourage local people, particularly those from ethnic minorities, to visit the Sheffield United ground and to see the club as a welcoming place. In 2009, Sheffield United took over the running of the event through the United Initiative, the club's new community arm, although FURD is still involved in the day.

Timeline of key events
1995 – Football Unites, Racism Divides established by fans, Sheffield United and community groups following attacks on Asian and Somali people in the vicinity of Bramall Lane.
Sep 1998 - Publication of the book 'The First Black Footballer: Arthur Wharton 1865-1930' by Phil Vasili, funded by FURD.
Feb 1999 – FARE (Football Against Racism in Europe) network founded by supporters' groups in 13 countries.  FURD is a founder member and partner.
May 1999 – FURD hosts first Community Day at Bramall Lane, which has since become an annual event.
Aug 2000 – Sharrow United, with sponsorship by FURD, is entered into the Sheffield Regional Alliance Sunday League and becomes the first predominantly Asian team in Sheffield's local leagues.
Oct 2001 – John Barnes and other guests speak at the Moving On Up conference at Sheffield Hallam University, organised by FURD and former Sheffield Wednesday and Bradford player Andy Kiwomya.
Nov 2002 – FARE wins MTV Free Your Mind human rights award.
June 2003: FURD is described as a 'model project' in the report 'Unite Against Racism in European Football: UEFA Guide to Good Practice'.
Jan 2004 – Kick It Out hosts a star-studded tenth anniversary celebration and FURD receive a special award for its pioneering work as a community-based anti-racist football project.
Apr 2004 – Sharrow United wins the Sheffield Regional Alliance Sunday League Cup.
Jun 2004 – Streetkick event hosted at the Euro 2004 in Portugal.
May 2005 – FURD delivers its first anti-racist training package to youth workers.
Jun 2006 – FURD tours Streetkick at the World Cup in Germany.
Jul 2006 – The Unity Cup, a tournament organised by Kick It Out for refugees and asylum seekers, is hosted in Sheffield by FURD.
Dec 2006 – An Ofsted report on Sheffield Futures, which manages parts of FURD's work, praises the work of FURD.
Apr 2007 – Sharrow United promoted to First Division of the Meadowhall Sheffield Sunday League.
Apr 2007 – Staff and volunteers for FURD have a civic reception hosted by the Lord Mayor Councillor Jackie Drayton at Sheffield Town Hall.
Nov 2007 – Pelé meets staff at FURD and backs the programme.
Dec 2007 – FURD's Burundian coach, Desbon Bushiri establishes the Football Between Communities project in the Democratic Republic of Congo.
Mar 2008 – FURD volunteer Abdi Hussein is presented the Community Champion Award by Graham Taylor at the Football Without Frontiers conference in Belfast.
Mar 2008 – Somalian footballer Liban Abdi, a former FURD trainee makes a first-team debut for Sheffield United in a friendly against sister-club Ferencváros and scores the winner in a 1-0 win.
May 2008 – Sharrow United win the Meadowhall Sunday League Cup.
Jun 2008 – Streetkick hosted in Austria and Switzerland during the European Football Championships.
Oct 2008 – FURD wins the Score4Africa diversity award ahead of Kick It Out and Rio Ferdinand.
Jan 2009 – Kyle Walker, originally recommended to Sheffield United by FURD in 1997, makes his first-team debut in an FA Cup match against Leyton Orient.
Feb 2009: Kyle Walker makes his debut for England Under-19s, coming on as a substitute in a friendly against Spain.
May 2009: FURD, Sheffield United and The Hub African-Caribbean Centre host the Laurie Cunningham Memorial Dinner at Bramall Lane as part of the Laurie Cunningham Project to commemorate Cunningham's life and the development of black football in Sheffield.
May 2010: Sharrow United win promotion to the Meadowhall League Premier Division in their 10th anniversary season.
June 2010: 'Offside! - Kick Out Ignorance - Football Unites, Racism Divides', an exhibition researched by FURD about South African footballers' experiences of playing in Britain from 1899 onwards, opens at the District Six Museum, Cape Town, South Africa, at the start of the World Cup finals in South Africa.

References 

Kassimeris, Christos (ed) (2009): Anti-Racism in European Football: Fair Play for All; Lexington Books; .
Brown, Gordon with Community Links (2007): Britain's Everyday Heroes: The Making of the Good Society Mainstream Publishing;

External links

Anti-racist organisations in the United Kingdom
Racism in association football
Charities based in England
Organisations based in Sheffield